Hypochrysops resplendens is a species of butterfly of the family Lycaenidae. It is found on Aru.

References

Butterflies described in 1908
Luciini